"Isa Pang Araw" (English: Another Day) is a song by Filipino singer-actress Sarah Geronimo, composed by Miguel Mendoza. It was used as theme song of Geronimo's film Miss Granny released in 2018 under Viva Films. It was nominated for "Best Original Song" at the 67th FAMAS Awards. The song was included on Spotify Philippines' Top OPM Songs of 2018. At the 32nd edition of Awit Awards, the song won Best Performance by a Female Recording Artist and Best Song Written and Performed for a Movie/TV/Stage Play.

Live performances 
Sarah Geronimo performed the song on various promotional mall tours for Miss Granny. The song made its Television debut when Geronimo performed the song on ASAP Natin 'To stage with Regine Velasquez on November 18, 2018. The song was included on Geronimo's repertoire for her This 15 Me World Tour on selected shows.

Music video 
The music video of the song was directed by Carlo Alvarez and was released on August 11, 2018.

Cover versions
 April Luz Tolentino sung the song on It's Showtimes Tawag ng Tanghalan in January 2018. 
 Another Tawag ng Tanghalan contender named Juliana Ruzelle performed the song in January 2018.
 Idol Philippines contestant Zephanie Dimaranan performed the song on the show for its "Philippines’ Most Streamed Hits" week.
 Singer Sam Mangubat also has his own rendition of the song published on his YouTube channel.
The Voice Kids Philippines Season 3 contestant Francis Indonto sung the song on the show's blind audition and became part of Bamboo's team.
Pinoy Dream Academy alumna Miguel Mendoza, the composer of the song uploaded his own version of the song on his YouTube channel.
 Top 20 contestant Cholo Bismonte covered the song on the second round of the third season of The Clash.
Regine Velasquez did a cover of this song during Unified concert in 2020, before COVID-19 pandemic.

Awards and nominations

References 

2018 singles
Sarah Geronimo songs
Tagalog-language songs